The Rajya Sabha (meaning the "Council of States") is the upper house of the Parliament of India. Mizoram elects 1 seat and they are indirectly elected by the state legislators of Mizoram, since 1972. Elections in within the state legislatures are held using Single transferable vote with proportional representation.

List of members

References

External links
Rajya Sabha homepage hosted by the Indian government
Rajya Sabha FAQ page hosted by the Indian government
Nominated members list
State wise list

Mizoram
 
Mizoram politicians
Rajya Sabha members